Cetshwayo kaMpande (1826 – 8 February 1884) was the king of the Zulu Kingdom from 1873 to 1879 and its Commander in Chief during the Anglo-Zulu War of 1879. His name has been transliterated as Cetawayo, Cetewayo, Cetywajo and Ketchwayo. Cetshwayo consistently opposed the war and sought fruitlessly to make peace with the British, and was defeated and exiled following the Zulu defeat in the war. He was later allowed to return to Zululand, where he died in 1884.

Early life 
Cetshwayo was a son of Zulu king Mpande and Queen Ngqumbazi, half-nephew of Zulu king Shaka and grandson of Senzangakhona. In 1856 he defeated and killed in battle his younger brother Mbuyazi, Mpande's favourite, at the Battle of Ndondakusuka. Almost all Mbuyazi's followers were massacred in the aftermath of the battle, including five of Cetshwayo's own brothers. Following this he became the ruler of the Zulu people in everything but name. He did not ascend to the throne, however, as his father was still alive.

His other brother, Umthonga, was still a potential rival. Cetshwayo also kept an eye on his father's new wives and children for potential rivals, ordering the death of his favourite wife Nomantshali and her children in 1861. Though two sons escaped, the youngest was murdered in front of the king. After these events Umtonga fled to the Boers' side of the border and Cetshwayo had to make deals with the Boers to get him back. In 1865, Umthonga did the same thing, apparently making Cetshwayo believe that Umtonga would organize help from the Boers against him, the same way his father had overthrown his predecessor, Dingane.

Furthermore, he had a rival half-brother, named uHamu kaNzibe who betrayed the Zulu cause on numerous occasions.

Reign 

Mpande died in 1872. His death was concealed at first, to ensure a smooth transition; Cetshwayo was installed as king on 1 September 1873. Sir Theophilus Shepstone, who annexed the Transvaal to the Cape Colony, crowned Cetshwayo in a shoddy, wet affair that was more of a farce than anything else, but turned on the Zulus as he felt he was undermined by Cetshwayo's skillful negotiations for land area compromised by encroaching Boers and the fact that the Boundary Commission established to examine the ownership of the land in question actually ruled in favour of the Zulus. The report was subsequently buried. As was customary, he established a new capital for the nation and called it Ulundi (the high place). He expanded his army and readopted many methods of Shaka. He also equipped his impis with muskets, though evidence of their use is limited. He banished European missionaries from his land. He might have incited other native African peoples to rebel against Boers in Transvaal.

Anglo-Zulu War 

In 1878, Sir Henry Bartle Frere, British High Commissioner for the Cape Colony, sought to confederate the colony the same way Canada had been, and felt that this could not be done while there was a powerful Zulu state bordering it. Frere thus began to demand reparations for Zulu border infractions and ordered his subordinates to send messages complaining about Cetshwayo's policies, seeking to provoke the Zulu king. They carried out their orders, but Cetshwayo kept calm, considering the British to be his friends and being aware of the power of the British Army. He did, however, state that he and Frere were equals and since he did not complain about how Frere administered the Cape Colony, the same courtesy should be observed by Frere in regards to Zululand. Eventually, Frere issued an ultimatum that demanded that Cetshwayo de facto disband his army. His refusal led to war in 1879, though he continually sought to make peace after the Battle of Isandlwana, the first engagement of the war. After an initial decisive but costly Zulu victory over the British at Isandlwana, and the failure of the other two columns of the three pronged British attack to make headway – indeed, one was bogged down in the Siege of Eshowe – the British retreated, other columns suffering two further defeats to Zulu armies in the field at the Battle of Intombe and the Battle of Hlobane. However, the British follow-up victories at Rorke's Drift and Kambula prevented a total collapse of the British military positions. While this retreat presented an opportunity for a Zulu counter-attack deep into Natal, Cetshwayo refused to mount such an attack, his intention being to repulse the British offensive and secure a peace treaty. However Cetshwayo's translator, a Dutch trader he had imprisoned at the start of the war named Cornelius Vijn, gave warnings to Chelmsford of gathering Zulu forces during these negotiations.

The British then returned to Zululand with a far larger and better armed force, finally capturing the Zulu capital at the Battle of Ulundi, in which the British, having learned their lesson from their defeat at Isandlwana, set up a hollow square on the open plain, armed with cannons and Gatling guns. The battle lasted approximately 45 minutes before the British ordered their cavalry to charge the Zulus, which routed them. After Ulundi was taken and burnt on 4 July, Cetshwayo was deposed and exiled, first to Cape Town, and then to London. He returned to Zululand in 1883.

From 1881, his cause had been taken up by, among others, Lady Florence Dixie, correspondent of The Morning Post, who wrote articles and books in his support. This, along with his gentle and dignified manner, gave rise to public sympathy and the sentiment that he had been ill-used and shoddily treated by Bartle Frere and Lord Chelmsford.

Later life 

By 1882 differences between two Zulu factions—pro-Cetshwayo uSuthus and three rival chiefs led by Zibhebhu—had erupted into a blood feud and civil war. In 1883, the British government tried to restore Cetshwayo to rule at least part of his previous territory but the attempt failed. With the aid of Boer mercenaries, Chief Zibhebhu started a war contesting the succession and on 22 July 1883 he attacked Cetshwayo's new kraal in Ulundi. Cetshwayo was wounded but escaped to the forest at Nkandla. After pleas from the Resident Commissioner, Sir Melmoth Osborne, Cetshwayo moved to Eshowe, where he died a few months later on 8 February 1884, aged 57–60, presumably from a heart attack, although there are some theories that he may have been poisoned. His body was buried in a field within sight of the forest, to the south near Nkunzane River. The remains of the wagon which carried his corpse to the site were placed on the grave, and may be seen at Ondini Museum, near Ulundi.

Cetshwayo's most prominent role in South African historiography is being the last king of the Zulu Kingdom. His son Dinuzulu, as heir to the throne, was proclaimed king on 20 May 1884, supported by (other) Boer mercenaries. A blue plaque commemorates Cetshwayo at 18 Melbury Road, Kensington.

In popular culture

Cetshwayo figures in three adventure novels by H. Rider Haggard: The Witch's Head (1885), Black Heart and White Heart (1900) and Finished (1917), and in his non-fiction book Cetywayo and His White Neighbours (1882). He is mentioned in John Buchan's novel Prester John. In the short story A Municipal Report in Strictly Business by O. Henry (1910) the face of a key character is compared to that of "King Cettiwayo". 

A character in the opera Leo, the Royal Cadet by Oscar Ferdinand Telgmann and George Frederick Cameron was named in his honour in 1889.

In the 1964 film Zulu, he was played by Mangosuthu Buthelezi, his own maternal great-grandson and the future leader of the Inkatha Freedom Party.

In the 1979 film Zulu Dawn, he was played by Simon Sabela.

In the 1986 miniseries Shaka Zulu, he was played by Sokesimbone Kubheka.

There is a brief allusion made to Cetshwayo in the novel Age of Iron by J.M. Coetzee in the line "The new Africans, pot-bellied, heavy-jowled men on their stools of office: Cetshwayo, Dingane in white skins."

Legacy

In 2016, the King Cetshwayo District Municipality was named after him.

References

Notes

Citations

Further reading

 Carolyn Hamilton, Terrific Majesty: The Powers of Shaka Zulu and the Limits of Historical invention, Harvard University Press, 1998.
 Ian Knight, By The Orders Of The Great White Queen: An Anthology of Campaigning in Zululand, Greenhill Books, 1992.
 Ken Gillings, Discovering the Battlefields of the Anglo-Zulu War, 2014.

1826 births
1884 deaths
19th-century monarchs in Africa
19th-century Zulu people
History of KwaZulu-Natal
Monarchs taken prisoner in wartime
People of the Anglo-Zulu War
Zulu kings